Safeguard Coaches is a bus and coach operator based in Guildford.

History

Safeguard was established in 1924 by Arthur Newman, when he converted an accident damaged lorry to carry passengers, and by 1927 was running bus services to the newly constructed Aldershot Road housing estate. Shortly afterwards, another service to Onslow Village commenced.

However, the main company in the area Aldershot & District Traction challenged Safeguard with six months of competition. After this, the two companies agreed that Safeguard would run the Woodside and Onslow routes, and both companies the Guildford Park service.

In time, Safeguard extended the Woodside route to Westborough and then to Park Barn, and the Guildford Park service reached Dennisville.

In 1988, Farnham Coaches was purchased, adding a significant number of vehicles to the Safeguard fleet.

In 2000, Safeguard gained the contract for the Guildford Shuttle, a free service connecting various parts of Guildford Town Centre. At first, a Plaxton Pointer bodied Dennis Dart SLF was acquired. This was replaced by an Optare Alero. However, this proved too small and so another Mini Pointer Dart was acquired.

More recently, in 2002, Safeguard lost some school bus work and Onslow routes 10/11 to Countryliner after ten years. As a result of this, the bus fleet was cut from ten to seven vehicles.

The Guildford Shuttle was withdrawn in August 2008, the council saying it was costing too much to operate.  Commencing 4 November 2018, Arriva launched routes A (to/from Royal Surrey County Hospital), B (to/from the Park Barn Estate) and C (to/from Stoughton) to rival the existing routes already operated by Stagecoach South and Safeguard. Safeguard retaliated with re-entry to Bellfields.

On 18 December 2021, following the withdrawal of Guildford operations by Arriva, Safeguard took control of the route 18, which ran from Onslow Village to Guildford town centre. This service was extended to Bushy Hill in Merrow via Burpham to cover gaps created by Stagecoach South's new route 6 on what were routes 36 and 37 from Arriva. This was on the same day as the company left Onslow Village 92 years ago, in 1929. A heritage bus was operated on the day of changes. From 30 August 2022, the route 18 will be transferred to Compass Travel.

Current services

Bus routes

Safeguard currently operate three circular bus routes, route 3, which runs to and from Bellfields estate; and routes 4 and 5 which run in opposite directions linking Park Barn with Guildford town centre. From 24 July 2010, Safeguard ran Merrow Park and Ride route 300 using Surrey County Council owned buses freed up following the withdrawal of the Ride Pegasus! school bus scheme by Surrey County Council. From September 2013, this service was being run by Stagecoach who won the contract to operate all of the town's Park & Ride network, Monday to Friday. For many years, Safeguard ran Guildford town services 3, 4 and 5 jointly with Arriva, however from 23 May 2010 the two companies agreed that Arriva would wholly run route 3 and Safeguard have complete control over the 4 and 5. As Arriva withdrew from the Guildford operations, Safeguard took over the Sundays and bank holidays services on route 3. As a result, in a little under three years the service had fully moved from Arriva to Safeguard.

From 30 August 2022, it was announced that Safeguard would take over a number of routes in the Woking area, which included four shopper's services and a school service.

Coaches

Most coach work is private hire, with a high amount of it coming from local schools. Coaches are also run to the University of Surrey from various places, including areas as far afield as Crawley and Chichester.

See also
List of bus operators of the United Kingdom

References

External links

Safeguard Coaches website
Farnham Coaches website

Bus operators in Surrey
Companies based in Guildford
Transport in Surrey
1924 establishments in the United Kingdom